The Tour de San Benedettu or Tour de Cala Rossa was a Genoese tower located in the commune of Lecci on the east coast of Corsica. The tower sat on the Punta di Benedettu at the north side of the Golfe de Porto-Vecchio. Only a few traces survive.

The tower was built in the second half of the 16th century. It was one of a series of coastal defences constructed by the Republic of Genoa between 1530 and 1620 to stem the attacks by Barbary pirates.

References

Towers in Corsica